El Cartel: Los Intocables or El Cartel De Yankee is the first El Cartel album by Daddy Yankee with various artists from Puerto Rico, including Hector y Tito, Alberto Stylee, Baby Ranks and more.
The song "Posición" was featured in the movie One Tough Cop.

Track listing
TRACK A - "El Cartel"

TRACK B - "Los Intocables"

Music videos/singles
Posicion - Daddy Yankee Winchester 30/30 & Alberto Stylee
Radio Version (Mataron un Inocente/ Por Que ?/ Que Sera Nuestro Destino) - Hector Y Tito & Eddie Dee & Mr. Cavalucci 
Abran Paso - O.G.M. & Oakley

Daddy Yankee compilation albums
1997 compilation albums
Spanish-language compilation albums